Susan Margaret Piper (born 1951) is a retired New Zealand trade unionist and local politician.

Biography 
Piper was born in Wellington in 1951. Her parents were Leon Bremmer "Pip" Piper and Margaret Neilson "Tilly" Hunter, both were trade unionists and active members of the Communist Party of New Zealand (CPNZ). As a child Piper and her brother Michael told anyone who would listen that they were communists and accordingly "they expected to share everything we [others] owned." Her mother Tilly divorced her father and remarried in 1959. Tilly had left the CPNZ and joined the Labour Party.

Tilly was an unsuccessful Labour candidate for the Wellington City Council in both 1977 and 1980. She was later awarded a Queen's Service Medal for public services at the 2001 New Year Honours. Her father Pip was also an unsuccessful Labour candidate for the Wellington City Council in both 1986 and 1989 in the Northern Ward.

Piper was involved in the anti-Vietnam War movement and became a member of the Labour Party herself. In 1974 she stood as a Labour candidate for the Wellington City Council, but was unsuccessful. She was on the organising committee of the 1975 United Women's Convention, working alongside leading feminist organisers such as Ros Noonan, Deidre Milne and Margaret Shields.

Piper worked in a number of unions, including the Clerical Workers Union, the Early Childhood Workers Union and the Public Service Association (PSA), where she was an executive officer from 1982 to 1987. In 1988 she stood for president of the PSA and won with 56,027 votes to 36,790 for PSA vice-president Colin Feslier. She was the first woman to hold the position. She contemplated standing for the Labour Party in the 1992 Wellington Central by-election.

Piper was elected a member of the Wellington City Council from 1995 to 2004. In her first term as a councillor she was appointed as chairman of the council's community, culture and recreation committee after the resignation of John Gilberthorpe after his appointment as executive director of the Wellington Museums Trust. After being re-elected in 1998 she became the leader of the Labour members on the council and was a contender for the job of deputy mayor.

She was chair of the Local Government Commission for six years, and chair of Sport Wellington. She has been president of Croquet New Zealand and served on the board of Museum of New Zealand Te Papa Tongarewa.

References

1951 births
Living people
People from Wellington City
New Zealand Labour Party politicians
Wellington City Councillors
People associated with the Museum of New Zealand Te Papa Tongarewa
New Zealand trade unionists
New Zealand sports executives and administrators